Rhysoconcha is a genus of small air-breathing land snails, terrestrial pulmonate gastropod mollusks in the family Charopidae.

Species
Species within the genus Rhysoconcha include:
 Rhysoconcha atanuiensis
 Rhysoconcha variumbilicata

References

 Info from Taxonomicon

 
Charopidae
Taxonomy articles created by Polbot